Datuk Larry Sng Wei Shien, is a Taiwanese-born Malaysian politician who has served as the Member of Parliament (MP) for Julau since May 2018. He served as Member of the Sarawak State Legislative Assembly (MLA) for Pelagus from September 2001 to April 2011. He was previously the State Chairman of the People's Justice Party (PKR) of Sarawak, a component party of the Pakatan Harapan (PH) coalition. On 28 February 2021, he left PKR to become an independent again and declared support for the ruling Perikatan Nasional (PN) coalition. He is currently the President of Parti Bangsa Malaysia (PBM) and has served in this role since January 2022. Following the 2022 general election, he is presently the sole PBM MP.

Early life and education
Sng was born on 14 September 1979 in Taipei to a Sarawakian businessman-politician father Sng Chee Hua and Taiwanese-born mother Susan Sng. His father is the former one-term Julau MP from 1995 to 1999, two-term Pelagus assemblyman from 1991 to 2001 and a renowned corporate player. Meanwhile, his grandfather Sng Chin Joo was also a Member of Parliament and Council Negri (now Sarawak State Legislative Assembly) member in 1963 and the Kapitan Cina in Kapit in the mid-80s. The family has a long track record with the Iban community in Sarawak, having resided in Jalan Airport, Kapit.

Sng grew up in Kuala Lumpur and in England, and studied at London School of Economics (LSE).

Political career
Sng joined the Sarawak Native People's Party (PBDS) in 2001 when he was 21. He first stood on the PBDS ticket in 2001 state election, replacing his father as the Pelagus representative. He had served two terms as Barisan Nasional (BN) state assemblyman of Sarawak for Pelagus from 2001 to 2011. Under the Chief Minister Abdul Taib Mahmud BN's administration in 2004, he was the Sarawak's youngest assistant minister when appointed the Assistant Minister in the Chief Minister's Office (Economic Planning) as well as Assistant Minister of Industrial Development (Planning).

Sng joined the new Parti Rakyat Sarawak (PRS) in 2004 which was founded by James Jemut Masing and his father the senior Sng in the wake of the de-registration of PBDS and succeeded it as a component of BN. In 2006 state election, he retained his Pelagus seat as a PRS candidate. He had been the PRS deputy secretary general under the presidency of Masing until a leadership tussle between them resulted in the revocation of Sng's party membership for insubordination in 2007.

In 2009, he was given additional portfolio of Assistant Minister of Youth (Training) albeit being a 'partyless independent' pro-BN status. He was subsequently dropped from contesting and defending the Pelagus state assembly seat under BN's banner in 2011 state election. Sng retained his position as the deputy chairman of Sarawak Convention Bureau (SCB) as well as Sarawak Convention Centre (now Borneo Convention Centre Kuching, BCCK) and was appointed Youth Affairs advisor to the Chief Minister Taib Mahmud's state government in 2012 amid his BN-friendly status.

Sng resigned from all his government appointments in 2013 to assume the position of founding president of the just formed Sarawak Workers Party (SWP) which proclaimed to be BN-friendly too. In the 2013 general election (GE13), he contested as SWP candidate in Lubok Antu parliamentary seat but lost. In March 2016, while serving as the SWP party president Sng had initially planned to contest the newly created state constituency of Bukit Goram in upcoming 2016 state election, but later in April he unexpectedly resigned from the party instead thus renouncing his candidacy. He explained he has quits although he could have won because he felt he could not truly serve the constituents without being in BN in an emotional post on his Facebook.

In the 2018 general election (GE14), Sng had contested as an Independent candidate and elected the MP for the Julau federal constituency by 10,105 of the 18,279 votes cast. He defeated Joseph Salang Gandum the four-term incumbent and PRS deputy president. He joined the PKR which is part of new Pakatan Harapan (PH) ruling coalition shortly after his victory in the election. He was picked during the PH's rules as chairman of the Malaysian Pepper Board (MPB) under the federal Ministry of Plantation Industries and Commodities from May 2018 to April 2020.

Following the collapse of PH in the February 2020 Malaysian political crisis also dubbed as 'Sheraton Move', Sng was then appointed as the Sarawak chief of PKR left vacant by incumbent Baru Bian who had turn to be independent and joined Parti Sarawak Bersatu (PSB). He announced on 21 December he was stepping down from the post only to retract it after persuasion including by Anwar Ibrahim later. Somehow in February 2021 he eventually quit PKR to revert to be an independent MP but supports the new Prime Minister Muhyiddin Yassin and his led Perikatan Nasional (PN) administration. Sng explained that he just wanted a stable government and continued backing UMNO's Ismail Sabri Yaakob as the new PN's Prime Minister following the resignation of Muhyiddin as the PN chairman on 16 August. Sng has been appointed as the new chairman of Malaysian Palm Oil Council (MPOC), a GLC to promote the market expansion of Malaysian palm oil and its products with effect from 1 October.

Together with Steven Choong, he announced the formation of Parti Bangsa Malaysia (PBM) on 19 November 2021.

Controversies

2018 Parti Keadilan Rakyat (PKR) party elections 
During PKR party elections in 2018, Anwar Ibrahim who has secured the presidency uncontested, hesitated to work with his elected deputy president and preferred on having his own line-up at the national level which led to a bitter contest of 2 divisive camps: Team Azmin Ali against Team Rafizi Ramli whereby Anwar supported the latter in the party polls. Sarawak PKR was affected too and the division reached its peak when the pro-Team Rafizi Julau PKR division headed by Sng suddenly gained a suspiciously high number of new members from 603 to 13,000 on 26 June. PKR president's support for Julau was obvious when PKR headquarters never took action against the Julau PKR division then.

Insulting critic over Twitter 
Following the tweets made by Parti Aspirasi Sains Malaysia president Kenneth Chai several political controversies, including Sng's termination from the Malaysian Pepper Board, Sng swiftly responded to the list by tweeting “burn in hell". Sng deleted his reply and subsequently deactivated his Twitter account. However, a Twitter user was quick to remind the politician that they had screenshots of the interaction.

2022 Parti Bangsa Malaysia (PBM) presidency dispute 
On 26 May 2022, Zuraida Kamarudin resigned from BERSATU and applied to join PBM. Her membership was approved on 9 June and she was also appointed as the party's president-designate. The decision of the appointment was approved by the party's political bureau and the supreme council. Sng issued a statement on 2 October that he is still the party president and he has not resigned from the position due to the incoming 15th general election.

On 8 October, 2022, PBM announced that Zuraida was appointed the party president after a meeting was held by the party's supreme council. Sng was quoted as saying he accepts the supreme council's decision and will not challenge the matter. However, on 26 October, Sng announced that he is the legitimate party president according to the records of the Registrar of Society.

On 2 November, after a meeting between Sng and Zuraida, PBM released a statement that Sng is recognised as the rightful party president.

Personal life
Sng was 27 years old when he married May Ting, age 29, on 14 October 2006. Ting is a political science and economics graduate from the National University of Singapore (NUS) and holds a Masters in commerce from an Australian university. She is the eldest daughter of Sarawak business magnate Ting Pek Khiing (known for his timber business and the Bakun Dam project), and his wife Chai Yu Lan.

Sng is known for his corporate social responsibility (CSR) and community services. He runs the Larry Sng Education Fund which has given over RM1 million to students from Pelagus and Bukit Goram pursuing higher learning. Sng was once touted as Sarawak's richest MP after he declared his and his wife's assets to be around RM11.78 million to the Malaysian Anti-Corruption Commission (MACC) in November 2018.

Election results

Honours
 :
 Companion Class II of the Exalted Order of Malacca (DPSM) – Datuk (2022)

See also
 Julau (federal constituency)
 Pelagus (state constituency)
 Parti Bangsa Malaysia (PBM)

Notes

References

External links

 

1979 births
Living people
Citizens of Malaysia through descent
Malaysian people of Teochew descent
Malaysian people of Hokkien descent
Malaysian people of Chinese descent
Malaysian people of Taiwanese descent
Politicians from Taipei
Malaysian businesspeople
Malaysian billionaires
Malaysian philanthropists
Malaysian politicians of Chinese descent
Malaysian political party founders
Leaders of political parties in Malaysia
Sarawak politicians
Independent politicians in Malaysia
Former People's Justice Party (Malaysia) politicians
Parti Rakyat Sarawak politicians
Parti Bansa Dayak Sarawak politicians
Members of the Dewan Rakyat
Members of the Sarawak State Legislative Assembly
Alumni of the London School of Economics
21st-century philanthropists
21st-century Malaysian politicians